Deh-e Rahman (also Romanized as Deh-e Raḩmān; also known as Raḩmān) is a village in Dust Mohammad Rural District, in the Central District of Hirmand County, Sistan and Baluchestan Province, Iran. At the 2006 census, its population was 385, in 79 families.

References 

Populated places in Hirmand County